Accelerated freefall (AFF) (known in Canada as progressive freefall, and in Finland as Nova (NOpeutettu VApaapudotus, a literal translation)) is a method of skydiving training. This method of skydiving training is called "accelerated" because the progression is the fastest way to experience solo freefall, normally from 10,000 to 15,000 feet above ground level (AGL). In static line progression, more jumps are required to experience freefall, but the jumps are less expensive for the student as one instructor can dispatch multiple students per load and students are initially dispatched from lower altitudes. Under accelerated freefall, one or sometimes two instructors are dedicated just to one student.

Training technique
In most AFF programs, two instructors jump with the student during their first three AFF jumps, although some programs may use only one instructor. On the initial levels, the instructor(s) hold on to the student until the student deploys their own parachute. Hence, this method is classified as harness hold training. The AFF instructors have no physical connection to the student other than their grip on the student, so once the student's parachute is deployed the instructors fly away and deploy their own canopies.

Deployment of the main canopy for students in an AFF program is generally 6000 ft AGL (one mile or 1600 m), down to 5000ft AGL on later levels. If the student experiences trouble in the deployment of their parachute, the instructors first use hand signals to remind the student to pull. If the student still experiences trouble, the instructors will assist their student by physically putting the student's hand on the pilot chute, but if the student still has trouble, the instructor will deploy for the student. The instructor may pull the student's main canopy at any time the student appears to be in danger. Extra pull handles are usually installed on student gear, giving additional access for instructors.

Once the student has proven they can deploy their own parachute on the first few jumps, the student will be released on subsequent levels and will have the opportunity to prove to their instructors that they have the basic flying skills required to maneuver in freefall without assistance. Each AFF level including and after level three is called a "release dive". This means that the student is briefed by the instructor that at a certain point in the freefall, the student will be released, although the instructor aims to remain nearby to assist in safety and teaching. On release skydives there is a possibility the instructor may not be able to dock and assist at pull time, so it is important that the student has already learned the skills required to activate their parachute at the safe altitude and in the right way. For this reason, students may not progress to the next level of AFF until they have completed all the targeted learning objectives of the previous level.

Instructors on all AFF levels have a hard deck where they must pull their own parachute and save their own life. If they have not been able to assist their student by this altitude, the student's rig is equipped with an automatic activation device (AAD) that will fire the reserve parachute if the student passes the activation altitude at freefall speeds. While it is extremely rare that a student will have an AAD activation, this final level of protection protects the student as much as possible from the consequences of being out of control or not being able to deploy their own parachute.

As the instructors freefall with the student, they are able to correct the student's body position and other problems during freefall by communicating with the student with hand signals in freefall and debriefing the student and conducting corrective training after the jump. Later levels only require one instructor and involve the student learning to perform aerial maneuvers such as turns, forward movement, flips, and fall rate control. The purpose of the maneuvers is to prove to the student and instructor that the student can perform a disorienting maneuver causing intentional instability followed by regaining control.

The instructor(s) determine when the student has passed the requirements for each level. During the AFF jumps, the student may have radio contact with ground personnel who direct the student's maneuvers under their parachute, however the student must have the skills for a solo landing in case the radio fails.

Licensing organizations and protocols
In the United States, there are no official government required training procedures. As long as a jumper wears equipment that meets certain Federal Aviation Administration (FAA) requirements in design and maintenance, anyone can intentionally exit an airborne aircraft legally. However, the United States Parachute Association (USPA), a non-profit organization that represents skydivers and drop zone owners, has written protocols and basic safety requirements that guide USPA-rated instructors on how to teach students to earn their USPA licences. While a licence is not required to jump legally, the USPA licence will allow the skydiver to travel to other USPA dropzones and use their licence to prove they have the skills required to jump. 

The USPA protocol for training students is called the "Integrated Student Program" (ISP). The ISP is separated into categories, each with targeted learning objectives that must be met before the student progresses to the next level. Static Line, AFF, and Tandem Progression all follow the same categories, but use different methods to train within each category.

Many drop zones classify their AFF levels by numbers, such as "AFF 6", but the USPA classification is by category letter. Categories A through E are the instructional jumps where the student must be accompanied with an appropriately rated instructor. Since most AFF programs have seven jumps, but there are only 5 letters between A and E, some categories require more than one jump to complete. After Category E, students are cleared to self supervise. Categories F, G and H are completed as solo skydives or with the assistance of a rated coach or instructor. The student must also complete two "hop n pops" in two different altitudes which are lower than the normal altitude. "Hop n pops" means the jumper must deploy the parachute immediately after exiting the aircraft, the purpose of "hop n pops" is to practice the exit procedure if under the situation of aircraft malfunctions. All jumps must completely match the requirement of BSR (Basic Safety Requirement). Once the student has completed 25 skydives, and has their A licence requirements signed off by an instructor or coach, they are eligible for their A licence and are no longer a student.

In the UK, there are 8 levels which must be completed by a student and signed off by the instructor, after which a further ten consolidation (consol) jumps must be recorded and signed off by a British Skydiving qualified instructor. The aim of each level of the programme is to equip the student with new skills which will enable them primarily to manage all of the safety requirements of skydiving and as a secondary consideration to learn the skills they need to progress as a qualified skydiver.

AFF Levels (UK) 
In the UK, the AFF programme includes 8 levels plus 10 consolidation jumps which break down as:

Level 1; student jumps with two instructors and practices the basics of good skydiving body position. They must demonstrate the ability to deploy their own parachute.

Level 2 and 3; building on level 1, the student will still jump with two instructors but those instructors may release their hold to allow the student to fly independently.

Level 4; building on the previous levels, the student will jump with just one instructor and will demonstrate the ability to turn in a controlled manner.

Level 5; reinforcing the skills learned on previous jumps, the purpose of this level is to reinforce turns. Other in air exercises may be added by the instructor.

Level 6; this is the student's first solo exit from the aircraft, after which they will display their ability to recover from instability by demonstrating an in-air backloop followed by horizonal movement across the sky (known as 'tracking').

Level 7; this is where the student will demonstrate all of the skills learned up to this point by demonstrating a solo exit, backloop, tracking and turns in a controlled manner and with altitude awareness.

Level 8; on this level, the student will exit the aircraft at a lower altitude and deploy their parachute within ten seconds - also known as a 'hop and pop'.

Consolidation jumps; throughout consols, the student will practice their skills in a controlled manner, showing good altitude awareness and canopy control.

See also

 Ram Air Progression System – an alternative training method

External links
 Australian Parachute Federation
 British Skydiving
 United States Parachute Association
 Svenska Fallskärmsförbundet
 Skydive Langar AFF Explanation

Parachuting